Walé Adeyemi MBE is a British-Nigerian fashion designer. He has worked as head designer at B-side, former creative director at New Era, an entrepreneur, industry spokesperson, music promoter, ambassador for The Prince's Trust and stylist to numerous celebrities.

His designs have been worn by Beyoncé, Rihanna, Ellie Goulding, Alicia Keys, The Black Eyed Peas, Usher, Missy Elliott, Jourdan Dunn, Estelle, Victoria Beckham, David Beckham, Mos Def, Tinie Tempah, Ms. Dynamite Just Jazz and Joey Badass to name but a few. British style markets have also used Walé for their brands; Adidas, Caterpillar Inc., Nokia, Martell, Slazenger, Superdrug, Sky and New Era have all been clients of Walé. Walé attended Thurrock and Basildon College and studied Fashion Design. At the age of 18, Adeyemi began an internship with British Designer Joe Casely-Hayford.

Adeyemi studied for a BTEC National Diploma in Design (Fashion) at South Essex College between 1990 and 1992, and an HND in Fashion Design at Kent Institute of Art and Design (now University for the Creative Arts) between 1992 and 1994.

The Walé Adeyemi collection debuted in 1998 as a menswear collection "somewhere between the kerb and the boutique". The brand now covers both menswear and womenswear. He was presented with the Fashion and Design Award at the Carlton Multi-Cultural Awards in 2001. 2004 saw Adeyemi nominated for the AoC Gold Award, which he won.

In 2005, Walé was noted for his iconic Graffiti Collection at the Victoria and Albert Museum, featuring him in the Moments in Black British Style exhibition. Walé received the Member of the Order of the British Empire (MBE) in the 2008 Birthday Honours for his contribution to British Fashion. The Wale Collection debuted and sold initially in Japan and London. In 2012, Walé opened his B-side by Wale store in Hanbury Street, East London. B-sidebywale is currently stocked in Harvey Nichols and Urban Outfitters.

Footnotes

External links
 www.b-sidebywale.com

Alumni of the University for the Creative Arts
English fashion designers
English people of Nigerian descent
English people of Yoruba descent
Yoruba fashion designers
Members of the Order of the British Empire
Year of birth missing (living people)
Living people